New Durham is a neighborhood in North Bergen Township in Hudson County, New Jersey, United States. It is located near the foot of Union Turnpike and Bergen Turnpike, and south of the Tonnelle Avenue Station of the Hudson Bergen Light Rail. It is one of the few residential areas along the otherwise industrial/commercial Tonnelle Ave, and site of one of the town's main post offices.

The area was the site of the colonial American community centered on the Three Pigeons when most of North Hudson was called Bergen Woods, a name recalled in  Bergenwood Section on the steep slopes of the west side of the Hudson Palisades. Bergen Turnpike was one of the plank roads Hackensack Plank Road, crossing the Bergen Hill and the Hackensack Meadows that joined the village at Bergen Square with that at Hackenack that had been made the county seat of then much larger Bergen County in 1710. A congregation, established in the 1800s, still uses the name for their church.

New Durham was a station stop on New York, Susquehanna and Western Railway's route into Pavonia Terminal, just north of Homestead and the Susquehanna Transfer.

The Meadowview Section of North Bergen rises to the east of New Durham to the Municipal Building on Kennedy Boulevard. This neighborhood is nestled between the many cemeteries-Flower Hill Cemetery, Grove Church Cemetery, Hoboken Cemetery, Macphelah Cemetery and Weehawken Cemetery, that characterize the area and collectively constitute one of the largest green open spaces in the otherwise densely populated North Hudson area.

See also
List of neighborhoods in North Bergen, New Jersey
Maisland

References

North Bergen, New Jersey
Neighborhoods in Hudson County, New Jersey
New Jersey Meadowlands District
Historic towns of Hudson County, New Jersey